Agnieszka Pogroszewska (born February 20, 1977) is a retired female hammer thrower from Poland. She set her personal best (67.98 metres) on June 8, 2001 at a meet in Poznań.

She represented Poland at the 2001 World Championships in Athletics and competed at the European Athletics Championships in 1998 and 2002. Pogroszewska has also taken part in the Summer Universiade, finishing eleventh in 2001 and improving to win the bronze medal at the 2003 Summer Universiade.

Competition record

References

1977 births
Living people
Polish female hammer throwers
Universiade medalists in athletics (track and field)
Place of birth missing (living people)
Universiade bronze medalists for Poland
Competitors at the 2001 Summer Universiade
Medalists at the 2003 Summer Universiade